The Baillie Islands (Inuvialuktun: Utkraluk) are located off the north coast of Cape Bathurst in the Northwest Territories, Canada. The islands formed part of the area used by the Avvaqmiut who are a branch of the Inuvialuit (Mackenzie Inuit).

A rare endemic plant known as hairy rockcress or hairy braya (Braya pilosa, genus Braya of family Brassicaceae) is known to grow in five locations on the Baillie Islands as well as the nearby Cape Bathurst. The plant is listed by the Northwest Territories Species at Risk Committee as threatened and by the Committee on the Status of Endangered Wildlife in Canada as endangered.

History
The first European to visit the area was John Richardson in 1826, who also named it. It was again visited by Richardson and John Rae, while searching the Northwest Passage for Franklin's lost expedition. In 1915, the Hudson's Bay Company established a trading post on the island. While the post was being set up, it was visited by competing trader Christian Theodore Pedersen. By the 1920s, the Royal Canadian Mounted Police had established a detachment on the island. It was at Baillie Island, in 1928, after returning from Cambridge Bay that Inspector Kemp, the Commanding Officer for the Western Arctic, appointed Henry Larsen captain of the St. Roch.

References

Uninhabited islands of the Northwest Territories
History of the Northwest Territories
Hudson's Bay Company trading posts
Islands of the Beaufort Sea
Former populated places in the Inuvik Region